WJRN-LP (95.9 FM) is a radio station broadcasting a Spanish music format. Licensed to Summerfield, Florida, United States, the station is currently owned by the Hispanic-Multicultural Broadcasting Association.

References

External links
 

JRN-LP
JRN-LP
JRN-LP